Jorge di Noco (born 27 February 1966) is an Argentine judoka. He competed in the men's extra-lightweight event at the 1984 Summer Olympics.

References

1966 births
Living people
Argentine male judoka
Olympic judoka of Argentina
Judoka at the 1984 Summer Olympics
Place of birth missing (living people)
Pan American Games medalists in judo
Pan American Games bronze medalists for Argentina
Judoka at the 1987 Pan American Games
Medalists at the 1987 Pan American Games
20th-century Argentine people
21st-century Argentine people